The Rans S-20 Raven is an American homebuilt aircraft that was designed by Randy Schlitter and is produced by Rans Designs of Hays, Kansas, introduced at AirVenture in August 2013. The aircraft is supplied as a kit for amateur construction and it is anticipated that it will later be offered as a complete ready-to-fly-aircraft in the light-sport aircraft category.

Design and development
The S-20 combines features from the Rans S-6 Coyote II and Rans S-7 Courier models. It differs from the S-6 in having the whole fuselage made from welded 4130 steel tubing and not just the cockpit cage and it uses the S-7's wings.

The aircraft features a strut-braced high-wing, a two-seats-in-side-by-side configuration enclosed cockpit accessed via bowed-out top-hinged doors to give increased shoulder room, fixed conventional landing gear or optionally tricycle landing gear made from 7075 aluminum with wheel pants and a single engine in tractor configuration.

The aircraft fuselage is made from welded 4130 steel tubing, while the wings are of aluminum construction, with all surfaces covered in doped aircraft fabric.

The manufacturer estimates the construction time from the supplied kit as 500–700 hours, with kits forecast to commence shipping in February 2014. A ready-to-fly LSA version is expected to be on the market by late 2015 at a cost of about US$120,000.

Operational history
In January 2014 one example was registered in the United States with the Federal Aviation Administration, although a total of two had been registered at one time.

Specifications (S-20 Raven taildragger)

References

External links

RANS S-20: The Cub Archetype Done Better by Paul Bertorelli, AVweb
Video: RANS' New S-20 Raven Debuts at Sport Expo by Paul Bertorelli, AVweb

S-20 Raven
2010s United States sport aircraft
2010s United States civil utility aircraft
Single-engined tractor aircraft
High-wing aircraft
Homebuilt aircraft